Flavia Tumusiime is a Ugandan actress, radio and television host, voice-over artist, emcee and author of 30 Days of Flavia. She presents a mid-morning radio show (AM-PM Show) on 91.3 Capital FM radio in Kampala, a former co-host of Morning @ NTV on NTV Uganda where she also doubles as a news anchor on NTV Tonight news and is a VJ for Channel O. She played the role of Kamali Tenywa (lead role) in Nana Kagga's television series, Beneath The Lies - The Series from 2014 to 2016 and has co-hosted the Guinness Football Challenge.

Early life and education
Tumusiime was born in 1989 in Kampala and is the only child of Enoch Tumusiime and Christine Asiimwe, who hail from Kabale, South Western Uganda. She attended St Theresa Kisubi for primary school, then joined Kitante Hill Secondary School for both "O" and "A" levels. She then attended Makerere University Business School where she graduated with a bachelor's degree in International Business.

Television
Tumusiime has been a television presenter since she was teenager. She started presenting on WBS TV's teen's club, a show she did with other teens for four years. Between 2010 and 2012, she presented K-files, another program on WBS TV. Since 2011, she has presented the Guinness football challenge. It has been aired on NTV (Uganda) and ITV & KTN (Kenya). In the same period, she has been a VJ on Channel O. She was also a presenter for Big Brother Africa in 2012.

Flavia joined NTV Uganda as a news anchor on NTV Tonight in 2016. She is a former co-host of a morning show Morning @ NTV which she started early 2018.

Radio
Tumusiime had a short stint working as a presenter on HOT100 FM in 2006 before finally settling at Capital FM where she has been to date.

Awards and recognition
 Young Achievers Award for Media and Journalism 2013
 Silver award in the best mid-morning show category at the 2013 Radio and TV awards.
Teeniez role model in 2013 Buzz Teeniez Awards.
 Best Dressed Female Media Personality Of The Year - Abryanz Style and Fashion Awards 2015
 Best Female Radio Personality - Uganda Entertainment Awards 2016

Filmography

Television shows

Film

See also
Jackie Lumbasi
Gaetano Kagwa
Nana Kagga Macpherson
Natasha Sinayobye

References

External links

1988 births
Living people
Ugandan film actresses
Ugandan television actresses
Ugandan radio presenters
People from Kampala
Makerere University alumni
Ugandan television presenters
Ugandan television personalities
21st-century Ugandan actresses
Ugandan women radio presenters
Ugandan women television presenters